Manilkara kauki is a plant in the subfamily Sapotoideae, and the tribe Sapoteae of the family Sapotaceae; and is the type species for the genus Manilkara. It occurs in tropical Asia from Indo-China (Cambodia, Myanmar, Thailand and Vietnam) to Malesia (Indonesia, Malaysia and Papua New Guinea); and also in northern Queensland in Australia. In Java, the plant is called sawo kacik, and is associated with the royal Javanese ritual. In India, the fruit is called  adão (Adam’s fruit) in Konkani. Throughout the world it is known generally by the name caqui, but in Australia it is called wongi.

Description
The leaves are rigid, blunt-tipped, dark-green on the upper leaf face, and pale and silky below. The edible, orange-red fruit is 3–4 cm long.

Uses
For reforestation purposes, M. kauki is a useful graft stock for M. zapota, and parts of the plant are used in herbal medicine. The fruit is reported to be very tasty, and is traditionally eaten by Torres Strait Islanders, who travel from island to island to harvest the crop.

References

kauki
Plants described in 1753
Taxa named by Carl Linnaeus
Flora of Queensland
Ericales of Australia
Trees of Indo-China
Trees of Malesia
Trees of New Guinea
Bushfood
Fruits originating in Asia